Charles Augustus Frisbee  (February 2, 1874 – November 7, 1954) was an outfielder in Major League Baseball. He played for the Boston Beaneaters and the New York Giants of the National League in 1899 and 1900. He went to college at Grinnell College.

External links

1874 births
1954 deaths
Boston Beaneaters players
New York Giants (NL) players
Baseball players from Iowa
Major League Baseball outfielders
19th-century baseball players
Minor league baseball managers
Portland Gladiators players
Quincy Little Giants players
Kansas City Blues (baseball) players
Worcester Farmers players
Cleveland Lake Shores players
Worcester Hustlers players
Montreal Royals players
Worcester Riddlers players
New Orleans Pelicans (baseball) players
Toledo Mud Hens players
Burlington Flint Hills players
Waterloo Microbes players
People from Franklin County, Iowa
People from Wright County, Iowa